Yukgaejang (肉개醬) or spicy beef soup is a spicy, soup-like Korean dish made from shredded beef with scallions and other ingredients, which are simmered together for a long time. It is a variety of gomguk, or thick soup, which was formerly served in Korean royal court cuisine. It is thought to be healthful and is popular due to its hot and spicy nature.

Also, yukgaejang was eaten mainly by people who were tired of the midsummer heat to take care of themselves.

In addition to shredded beef, scallions, and water, the dish generally also includes bean sprouts, gosari (bracken fern), torandae (taro stems), sliced onion, dangmyeon (sweet potato noodles), chili powder, garlic, perilla seeds (also called wild sesame seeds), soy sauce, oil (sesame oil and/or vegetable oil), black pepper, and salt. Chili oil may also be used. Yukgaejang is generally served with a bowl of rice and kimchi.

Variety 

The dish may alternatively be made with chicken rather than beef, in which case it is called dak-yukgaejang or dakgaejang.

See also
 Gomguk
 Goulash
 Fisherman's Soup
 List of beef dishes

References

 Yukgaejang at Doosan Encyclopedia
 Yukgaejang at Korean Culture Encyclopedia

External links

Yukgaejang video

Korean beef dishes
Korean soups and stews
Spicy foods
Chili pepper dishes
Noodle soups
Taro dishes
Korean chicken dishes